Mamidala is a village in Tirumalagiri mandal of Suryapet district, Telangana, India.

Eminent Agricultural scientist Aldas Janaiah and Prof. M Jagadesh Kumar were born in this village.

Demographics
According to Indian census, 2001, the demographic details of this village is as follows:
 Total Population: 	5,173 in 1,216 Households.
 Male Population: 	2,589
 Female Population: 	2,584
 Children Under 6-years: 	707 (Boys Under 6 Yrs: 	365 and Girls Under 6 Yrs: 	342)
 Total Literates: 	2,104

References

Villages in Nalgonda district